Semisulcospira hongkongensis is a species of freshwater snail with an operculum, an aquatic gastropod mollusk in the family Semisulcospiridae.

Distribution 
This species occurs in Anhui Province, Shanghai City, China.

References

External links

Semisulcospiridae